is a passenger railway station located in the city of Kasai, Hyōgo Prefecture, Japan, operated by the third-sector Hōjō Railway Company.

Lines
Hōjōmachi Station is a terminus of the Hōjō Line and is 13.4 kilometers from the opposing terminus of the line at Ao Station.

Station layout
The station consists of one dead-headed side platform. The station is staffed.

Adjacent stations

History
Hōjōmachi Station opened on March 3, 1915. The current station building as completed in 2011 at a location 100 meters from its original site.

Passenger statistics
In fiscal 2018, the station was used by an average of 524 passengers daily.

Surrounding area
 Tamaoka Kofun cluster
 Rakan-ji
 Sumiyoshi Jinja
 Kasai City Hall

See also
List of railway stations in Japan

References

External links
 
  

Railway stations in Hyōgo Prefecture
Railway stations in Japan opened in 1915
Kasai, Hyōgo